Y Cymro – The Welshman is a named passenger train of the Great Western Railway running between  and .

The Welshman was a named passenger train of the London, Midland and Scottish Railway that ran from London Euston Station to Holyhead with portions for Llandudno, Pwllheli and Porthmadog.

References 

Named passenger trains of the London, Midland and Scottish Railway
Named passenger trains of British Rail